Wayne Black and Sandon Stolle were the defending champions, but did not partner together this year.  Black partnered Andrew Kratzmann, losing in the first round.  Stolle partnered Paul Haarhuis, losing in the final.

Alex O'Brien and Jared Palmer won the title, defeating Haarhuis and Stolle 6–4, 7–6(7–5) in the final.

Seeds

Draw

Finals

Top half

Bottom half

References
Association of Tennis Professionals (ATP) Men's Doubles draw

Doubles men
2000 ATP Tour